Carlos de la Guerra (28 July 1912 – 5 June 1987) was a Peruvian athlete. He competed in the men's long jump at the 1936 Summer Olympics.

References

External links

1912 births
1987 deaths
Athletes (track and field) at the 1936 Summer Olympics
Peruvian male long jumpers
Olympic athletes of Peru
20th-century Peruvian people